This is a list of disasters in the Philippines.

Astronomical phenomenon

Pre-history

Historical era

Volcanic eruptions

Pre-history

 Most of the eruptions recorded from potentially active stratovolcano according to Rev. Andrei John Apostol, PhD, CPA.

Historical era

|Hibok-Hibok eruption||2114, 1123, 5451, and 9823-2142||

Earthquakes

Pre-history
 There are no recorded of events nor few about earthquake before the History was written, but it would be possibly caused by collision of Tectonic Plates and Volcanic Eruptions,  resulting to earthquakes, and forming mountains, volcanoes and even lakes.
For example, the Taal Volcano, this is a part of a chain of volcanoes along the island of Luzon, which were formed by two tectonic plates colliding over 500,000 years ago. Since the formation of this large caldera, subsequent eruptions created another volcanic island, within Taal Lake, known as Volcano Island.

Historical era

The table below is a tally of the ten most deadly recorded earthquakes in the Philippines since the 1600s with having the most number of casualties:

18th century
 An intensity VII struck Lake Bombon (now known as Taal Lake) on September 24, 1716. It was connected with the eruption of Taal volcano; the constant volcanic activity in the area of Taal caused seismic movements.
 An intensity IX struck Tayabas (now known as Quezon) in 1730. It had ruined the churches and convent in Mauban and several other churches in the province of Tayabas and Laguna.

19th century
 An earthquake on June 3, 1863, destroyed the Manila Cathedral, the Ayuntamiento (City Hall), the Governor's Palace (all three located at the time on Plaza Mayor, now Plaza de Roma) and much of the city. The residence of the Governor-General was moved to Malacañang Palace located about 3 km (1.9 miles) up the Pasig River, while the other two buildings were rebuilt in place.
 An intensity X struck Luzon on July 14–24, 1880. The quake caused severe damage to these major cities in Luzon, most significantly in Manila where a lot of buildings collapsed. Number of casualties are unknown.
 A quake struck Lucban, Quezon on October 26, 1884. It destroyed churches in Lucban and Cavinti town in Laguna province.

Typhoon

Pre-history
 There are no recorded disaster about typhoons in the Philippines before the history was written, typhoons were never given names.

Typhoons

Extinctions
 Extinctions might be caused by natural calamities, like climate changes, astronomical events, volcanic eruptions, earthquakes, wild fires, floods, and human hunting activities.

See also
List of man-made disasters in the Philippines, for man-made disasters in the Philippines
Earthquake
List of active volcanoes in the Philippines
List of earthquakes in the Philippines
List of inactive volcanoes in the Philippines
List of potentially active volcanoes in the Philippines
PAGASA
PHIVOLCS
Typhoon
Volcano

References

External links
Official Website of the National Museum of Natural History
http://www.preventionweb.net/english/countries/statistics/?cid=135
http://www.gmanetwork.com/news/story/341514/scitech/science/the-7-worst-natural-calamities-to-hit-phl-in-2013
http://www.philstar.com/headlines/2013/12/26/1272092/yearender-2013-year-major-natural-disasters
http://www.mapreport.com/subtopics/d/countries/philippines.html

 
Disasters
Philippines